Mohave Valley ('Amat' 'Analy Uuhwely in Mojave) is an unincorporated community and census-designated place (CDP) in Mohave County, Arizona, United States. The population was 2,693 at the 2020 census. It is geographically connected to Needles, California, Fort Mohave and Bullhead City.

History

The first recorded European to come through Mohave Valley was Melchor Díaz. He documented his travels in what is now northwestern Mohave County in 1540. He recounts meeting a large population of natives who referred to themselves as the Pipa Aha Macav, meaning "People by the River". From "Aha Macav" came the shortened name "Mojave" (also spelled "Mohave"). While Mohave Valley and Mohave County use the modern English spelling, the tribe retains the traditional Spanish spelling "Mojave". Both are correct, and both are pronounced "Moh-hah-vee".

Geography
Mohave Valley is located in western Mohave County at  (34.956929, -114.584613), in the valley of the same name, drained by the Colorado River. The Mohave Valley CDP is bordered to the south by Arizona Village, to the west by Willow Valley, and to the north by Mohave Ranch Estates, all CDPs.

Demographics

As of the census of 2000, there were 13,694 people, 5,217 households, and 3,850 families residing in the CDP. The racial makeup of the CDP was 90.8% White, 0.5% Black or African American, 2.3% Native American, 0.9% Asian, 0.1% Pacific Islander, 3.3% from other races, and 2.1% from two or more races.  12.0% of the population were Hispanic or Latino of any race.

There were 5,217 households, out of which 29.6% had children under the age of 18 living with them, 59.4% were married couples living together, 9.1% had a female householder with no husband present, and 26.2% were non-families. 19.0% of all households were made up of individuals, and 8.1% had someone living alone who was 65 years of age or older.  The average household size was 2.61 and the average family size was 2.94.

In the CDP, the population was spread out, with 24.6% under the age of 18, 5.7% from 18 to 24, 25.8% from 25 to 44, 27.4% from 45 to 64, and 16.5% who were 65 years of age or older.  The median age was 41 years. For every 100 females, there were 101.9 males.  For every 100 females age 18 and over, there were 100.9 males.

The median income for a household in the CDP was $34,321, and the median income for a family was $38,897. Males had a median income of $29,719 versus $21,271 for females. The per capita income for the CDP was $16,287.  About 7.9% of families and 11.0% of the population were below the poverty line, including 15.5% of those under age 18 and 6.1% of those age 65 or over.

Agriculture
Agriculture constitutes a major portion of Mohave Valley's economy. Main crops are cotton and alfalfa.

Education
Children from Mohave Valley attend Mohave Valley Elementary School District.

High school students attend River Valley High School in the Colorado River Union High School District and also have the option to attend the Academy of Building Industries Public Charter High School located in Fort Mohave, Arizona, or the Aha Macav High School on the Fort Mojave Indian Reservation.

See also
 Laughlin/Bullhead International Airport
 Mohave people

References

External links

Census-designated places in Mohave County, Arizona
Communities in the Lower Colorado River Valley
Arizona placenames of Native American origin
Arizona populated places on the Colorado River